The twenty-third series of Made in Chelsea, a British structured-reality television programme began airing on 4 April 2022, and concluded after ten episodes on 6 June 2022. For the first time since 2016, episodes due to air the following week were uploaded to All4.

The series included new cast member Joel Mignott, who joined as the boyfriend of already established cast member Robbie. The series also featured returns for Emma Walsh and Tabitha Willett, as well as Melissa Tattam making a one-off return appearance during the first episode. Following their departures, long term cast members Sam Thompson and Sophie Hermann did not feature in this series. This series heavily focused on Maeva seeking a marriage proposal from James, the end of the line for Emily and Harvey's relationship following a cheating scandal, a love triangle between Inga, Verity and Sam, as well as a turbulent romance between Digby and recent returnee Emma.

Cast

Episodes

Ratings
Due to BARB now only releasing figures for the 50 most-watched weekly programmes, there are no official ratings for this series.

External links

References

2022 British television seasons
Made in Chelsea seasons